Pârâul Cetății may refer to:

 Pârâul Cetății, a tributary of the Baraolt in Covasna County, Romania
 Pârâul Cetății, a tributary of the Belcina in Harghita County, Romania
 Pârâul Cetății (Olt), a tributary of the Olt River in Harghita County, Romania
 Pârâul Cetății, a tributary of the Telejenel in Prahova County, Romania

See also 
 Cetate (disambiguation)
 Cetățuia River (disambiguation)